SS Fort Cataraqui was a North Sands-type Fort ship. The North Sands type, along with similar Park, Fort, and Canadian Liberty classes were essentially British and Canadian variants of the American Liberty and Victory classes. Fort Cataraqui is notable for being the first Allied ship to enter the port of Antwerp after the Canadian First Army cleared the Scheldt Estuary during the Battle of the Scheldt in the Second World War.

The vessel was built by Davie Shipbuilding & Repair Company, in Lauzon, Quebec and was delivered in October 1942. Fort Cataraqui survived the war and was broken up in 1960 in Mobile, Alabama. During World War II, 28 were lost to enemy action, and four were lost due to accidents. Many of the surviving 166 ships passed to the United States Maritime Commission.

See also

References

World War II merchant ships of Canada
1942 ships